Francisco Prat (born 27 January 1944) is a Spanish alpine skier. He competed in the men's giant slalom at the 1964 Winter Olympics.

References

1944 births
Living people
Spanish male alpine skiers
Olympic alpine skiers of Spain
Alpine skiers at the 1964 Winter Olympics
Place of birth missing (living people)
20th-century Spanish people